Geimer is a surname. Notable people with the surname include:

Gene Geimer (born 1949), American soccer player
William Geimer (1937–2002), American lawyer and government official
Samantha Geimer, Roman Polanski abuse victim

See also
Geiger (surname)